Saint-Félix-de-Rieutord (Languedocien: Sent Felitz de Riutòrt) is a commune in the Ariège department in southwestern France.

Population
Inhabitants of Saint-Félix-de-Rieutord are called Saint-Félixéens.

See also
Communes of the Ariège department

References

Communes of Ariège (department)
Ariège communes articles needing translation from French Wikipedia